

Lady of Ferrara

House of Este, 1187–1264

Marchioness of Ferrara

House of Este, 1264–1471

Duchess of Ferrara

House of Este, 1471–1598

Notes

Sources

 
House of Este
Ferrara, consorts